Maino De Maineri, also known as Magninus Mediolanensis, (died 1368) was a 14th-century Italian physician, astrologer and writer of many regimen sanitatis—manuals of popular advice on how to live a preventive lifestyle, which were especially popular from the mid-13th century onwards. Milanese Maino was a Regent master at the University of Paris and was later court physician and astrologer to the House of Visconti in Milan.

Maineri Patrons 

Robert I, king of Scots, (1274-1329), Robert the Bruce. In an article for the Scottish Historical Review entitled 'Physician to the Bruce: Maino De Maineri in Scotland', Caroline Proctor says: "The implications for the history of medicine in medieval Scotland are significant, suggesting that, at least at court level, Scots demanded and could afford and attract a high quality of medical treatment." She urged a re-evaluation of the medical culture of medieval Scotland.Andrea Ghini de Malpighi', born in Florence, awarded a doctorate in utroque iure in both canon and civil law from the Collège de Sorbonne in Paris.  Malpighi became Bishop of Arras and Treasurer of the Archdiocese of Reims, a councillor of king Philip V of France, (c.1292-1322), and almoner to Charles le Bel, (1294-1328).  Founder of the Collège des Lombards at the University of Paris in 1334.  Malpighi was made a cardinal by Clement VI on 20 September 1342, and as Papal Legate to Aragon he was in charge of peace negotiations between Peter IV of Aragon and the king of Majorca, James III.  Malpighi died unexpectedly in this role whilst en route from Perpignan on 2 June 1343 to meet with king James.

 Physicians in 14th Century Italy 

Italy was considered to be the home of Europe's best physicians in the 14th century.  The Latin West benefited from the introduction of Arabic treatises, and the Universities of Bologna, Padua and Salerno were considered the most prestigious schools.  Italian graduates as a whole were prized for their medical knowledge and for their pioneering expertise in surgery.  Almost every physician was an astrologer and Maino De Mainero was not an exception.  One of his last works, written about 1360 and entitled Libellus de preservatione ab epydimia'', focusses on the astrological roots of the Black Death.

References

External links 
 http://muse.jhu.edu/login?auth=0&type=summary&url=/journals/scottish_historical_review/v086/86.1proctor.html
 
 :fr:Andrea Ghini Malpighi

Prof. Martha Carlin Home Page, University of Wisconsin-Milwaukee, has two Manieri MS under Medieval Culinary Texts (500-1500) https://pantherfile.uwm.edu/carlin/www/*

Year of birth missing
1368 deaths